Common names: Texas long-nosed snake.
Rhinocheilus lecontei tessellatus is a subspecies of nonvenomous colubrid snake, which is native to the western United States and northern Mexico.

Geographic range
R. l. tessellatus is found in the United States, primarily in Texas, but also in New Mexico, Oklahoma, Colorado, and Kansas, as well as in northern Mexico.

Description
 
The Texas long-nosed snake is a tricolor subspecies. Its color pattern consists of a cream-colored or white body, overlaid with black blotches, with red between the black. This color pattern gives it an appearance vaguely similar to that of a venomous coral snake, Micrurus tener or Micruroides euryxanthus. It has an elongated snout, to which its common name refers. It may grow to approximately 30 inches (76 cm) in total length (including tail); record 41 inches (104 cm). In some western localities the red coloration can be greatly reduced, giving it a black and white banded appearance, and in other localities the red appears more orange or even pink in color. Rhinocheilus lecontei differs from all other harmless snakes in the United States by having undivided subcaudal plates.

Unlike other subspecies of R. lecontei, this subspecies, R. l. tessellatus, has a sharp snout with a distinct upward tilt, and the rostral scale is raised above the level of the adjacent scales.

Behavior
The Texas long-nosed snake is a shy, nocturnal burrowing subspecies.

Diet
R. l. tessellatus feeds on lizards and amphibians, sometimes smaller snakes and, infrequently, rodents.

Reproduction
Rhinocheilus lecontei tessellatus is oviparous, laying clutches of 4-9 eggs in the early summer, which hatch out in the late summer, or early fall.

Defense
The Texas long-nosed snake is not likely to bite; its primary defense is to release a foul smelling musk, or blood from the cloaca as a defense mechanism if harassed.

Conservation status
This subspecies, R. l. tessellatus, holds no federal conservation status and no status through most of its range, but it is considered to be vulnerable in Kansas and Oklahoma, and critically endangered in Colorado. Primary threats are from habitat destruction.

References

External links
NatureServe Explorer: Rhinocheilus lecontei 
Texas Long-nosed Snake
Zipcode Zoo: Texas Long-nosed Snake
Long-nosed Snakes, with many photos of different subspecies, color variants, and habitats
Digital Desert: Long-nosed Snake, with extensive list of links

Further reading
Garman, S. (1883). "The Reptiles and Batrachians of North America". Memoirs of the Museum of Comparative Zoology at Harvard College 8: xxxi + 1-185. (Rhinocheilus lecontei tesselatus, p. 74).
Stebbins, R.C. (2003). A Field Guide to Western Reptiles and Amphibians, Third Edition. The Peterson Field Guide Series. Boston and New York: Houghton Mifflin. xiii + 533 pp.  (paperback). (Rhinocheilus lecontei tessellatus, p. 370 + Map 155).
Wright, A.H., and A.A. Wright (1957). Handbook of Snakes of the United States and Canada. Ithaca and London: Comstock Publishing Associates, a Division of Cornell University Press. 1,105 pp. (in 2 volumes) (Rhinocheilus lecontei tessellatus, pp. 641–644, Figure 187 + Map 48 on p. 634).

Rhinocheilus
Snakes of North America
Fauna of the Western United States
Reptiles of Mexico
Reptiles of the United States